Lie Tjoe Hong, 3rd Majoor der Chinezen (1846–1896) was a Chinese-Indonesian bureaucrat who served as the third Majoor der Chinezen, or Chinese headman, of Batavia, now Jakarta, capital of Indonesia. This was the most senior Chinese position in the colonial civil bureaucracy of the Dutch East Indies. As Majoor, Lie was also the Chairman of the Chinese Council of Batavia (Dutch: Chinese Raad; Bahasa Indonesia: Kong Koan), the city's highest Chinese government body.

Life

Lie Tjoe Hong Sia was born in 1846 in Batavia into the Lie family of Pasilian, an eminent landowning family of the 'Tjabang Atas' gentry with a tradition of public service. His father, Lie Pek Thaij (1809 - 1848), was an honorary Kapitein der Chinezen, while his grandfather, Lie Tiang Ko (1786 - 1855) had the rank of  der Chinezen (1847 - 1850), then Kapitein-titulair der Chinezen (1850 - 1855) under Tan Eng Goan, the first Majoor der Chinezen of Batavia. Two of Majoor Lie Tjoe Hong's uncles, Kapitein Lie Pek Tjiat and  Lie Pek Tat, were also as Chinese officers. 

He bore the hereditary title 'Sia' as a descendant of Chinese officers. His own bureaucratic career began with an appointment as  der Chinezen of the outlying district of Lonthar Tanara in Banten from 1866 until 1869. 

From 1872 until 1876, he served as  der Chinezen in Batavia under his predecessor, Tan Tjoen Tiat, the city's second Majoor der Chinezen. Lie Tjoe Hong was elevated to the higher post of Kapitein der Chinezen, which he held from 1876 until 1879. When Majoor Tan Tjoen Tiat retired from his post, Lie was appointed by the colonial government to succeed the former as third Majoor der Chinezen. 

In February 1891, in recognition of the Majoor's 20 years of government service as a Chinese officer, he was awarded the Gold Medal of the Star for Loyalty and Merit by Royal Decree. Majoor Lie Tjoe Hong served in office until 20 July 1896, when he resigned. 

Lie died six days after his resignation, and was buried in Grogol, Batavia. 

His son, Kapitein Lie Tjian Tjoen (1886 - 1964), would continue the family tradition of public service, and served as both a Chinese officer and member of the Chinese Council. His daughter-in-law, Ny. Kapitein Lie Tjian Tjoen (born Aw Tjoei Lan), was a prominent philanthropist and founder of the charity organisation Ati Soetji. The Majoor's son-in-law, Hok Hoei Kan (1881 - 1951), was the most prominent politician of the centre-right political party Chung Hwa Hui (CHH) in the first half of the twentieth century, and served in the Volksraad (colonial parliament) of the Dutch East Indies.

References

1846 births
1896 deaths
Lie family of Pasilian
Sia (title)
People from Batavia, Dutch East Indies
People of the Dutch East Indies
Indonesian people of Chinese descent
Indonesian Hokkien people
Kapitan Cina in Indonesia